Toby Creek is a  long 1st order tributary to Mallard Creek in Mecklenburg County, North Carolina.

Course
Toby Creek rises in the Junker community of Charlotte, North Carolina and then flows northeast through the northern suburbs of Charlotte to eventually join Mallard Creek.  Toby Creek runs through the campus of UNC-Charlotte on its ways to Mallard Creek.

Watershed
Toby Creek drains  of area, receives about 46.6 in/year of precipitation, has a wetness index of 416.62, and is about 14% forested.

References

Rivers of North Carolina
Rivers of Mecklenburg County, North Carolina